Professor Janice L. Chapman AUA [born January 1938 ]MOA is an Australian-born soprano, voice researcher, and vocal consultant. She is the author of Singing and Teaching Singing: A Holistic Approach to Classical Voice (often abbreviated as 'SATS') first published by Plural Publishing Inc. at the end of 2005 (now in its fourth edition), and she has contributed to papers in the Journal of Voice, The Journal of the Acoustical Society of America and Australian Voice. She is also a professor of voice at the Guildhall School of Music and Drama in London.

Her career as a performer includes principal soprano roles in all the major British opera companies, including The Royal Opera House and English National Opera. Since 1975, she has also played an active role in teaching vocal technique, first at London College of Music and then both privately and at the Guildhall School of Music and Drama. She was a founder member of the Voice Research Society, now known as the British Voice Association, of which she was president for five years. She became a Fellow of the BVA in 2012. Chapman is also an Honorary President of The Association of Teachers of Singing (AOTOS) in the United Kingdom.

She was awarded the Medal of the Order of Australia for 'services to music as an operatic singer and teacher of voice and as a contributor to research into human sound production and vocal health'.

Career 
Her roles included Sieglinde, Third Norn, Fata Morgana, Aida, Vitellia, Donna Anna, Abigaille, Ellen Orford, Mrs Grose, and Lady Billows. She has broadcast for the B.B.C. and appeared in concerts and recitals worldwide.

Chapman is also regarded as one of the world's leading vocal pedagogues - her clients hail from all over Europe and regularly come to London for lessons and mentoring. She is currently a Professor of the vocal faculty of The Guildhall School of Music and Drama. She was an invited Master Teacher at the New Zealand ICVT conference in 1994, again as Plenary speaker in Paris in 2008 and most recently in Stockholm in 2017. She also gave the 'Voice of Experience' lecture at the Pan European Voice Conference in Ghent in the Summer of 2017.

Chapman runs yearly multidisciplinary training courses for singing teachers, singers and voice professionals based on her book - Classical Voice Training Ltd. was founded to organise and run the official courses. Previous courses have been held at the Guildhall School of Music and Drama, London, and Chethams School of Music in Manchester.

Chapman's book, "Singing and Teaching Singing – A Holistic Approach to Classical Voice", has been adopted as a course textbook in many universities and colleges worldwide. The fourth edition (2021), co-authored with Dr Ron Morris, has been recently published, including new chapters and contributing authors, and updated digital resources and an updated glossary of terms.

Awards 

Chapman was awarded a Medal of the Order of Australia "for service to music as an operatic singer and teacher of voice, and as a contributor to research into human sound production and vocal health" In the Australia Day Honours, January 2004. In 2010 Chapman was made a Fellow and in 2016 a Professor of the Guildhall School of Music and Drama. In 2012 The Association of Teachers of Singing in the UK invited her to become an Honorary President and she became an honorary president of the British Voice Association.

References 

 http://www.gsmd.ac.uk/music/staff/teaching_staff/department/5-department-of-vocal-studies/233-janice-chapman/
 
 
 
 Chapman, J. L., & Morris, R. (2021). Singing and teaching singing : a holistic approach to classical voice (Fourth Edition ed.). Plural Publishing, Inc.

External links
 Personal Website
 Chapman at Classical Voice Training Ltd.
 Events and Courses

1938 births
Living people
Australian operatic sopranos
Voice teachers